The 1985–86 Maltese Premier League was the 6th season of the Maltese Premier League, and the 71st season of top-tier football in Malta.  It was contested by 8 teams, and Rabat Ajax F.C. won the championship.

League standings

Results

References
Malta - List of final tables (RSSSF)

Maltese Premier League seasons
Malta
1985–86 in Maltese football